is a Japanese politician of the Democratic Party of Japan, a member of the House of Councillors in the Diet (national legislature) and is the former Minister of Defence.

A native of Komatsu, Ishikawa and graduate of Mie University, he worked at the Ministry of Agriculture, Forestry and Fisheries from 1965 to 1990, and had served in the assembly of Ishikawa Prefecture for two terms since 1991. He was elected to the House of Representatives for the first time in 1996 as a member of the New Frontier Party by proportional representation – he failed to win the Ishikawa 2nd district from Liberal Democrat Yoshirō Mori four times in a row. After losing also his proportional seat in 2005, he was elected to the House of Councillors for the first time in 2007. In 2011, under Prime Minister Yoshihiko Noda's cabinet, he was selected as Minister of Defense

In December 2011 he was the subject of a censure motion from the opposition LDP for failing to know the details of the 1995 rape where three US servicemen kidnapped and sexually assaulted a 12-year-old girl. This followed his subordinate Satoshi Tanaka speaking with reporters in a bar and using euphemisms for sexual assault to discuss moving the US Futenma airbase. Tanaka was sacked as director of the Okinawa Defense Bureau, and in the cabinet reshuffle of January 13, 2012 Ichikawa was replaced by Naoki Tanaka.

Notes

References

External links 
  in Japanese.

1942 births
Democratic Party of Japan politicians
Living people
Japanese defense ministers
Members of the House of Councillors (Japan)
Members of the House of Representatives (Japan)
New Frontier Party (Japan) politicians
20th-century Japanese politicians
Politicians from Ishikawa Prefecture
21st-century Japanese politicians